Rugby union, specifically in the sevens format, was introduced as a World Games sport for men at the 2001 World Games in Akita. Fiji entered the 2009 games as the two time defending gold medalists. Held on July 24 and 25 of 2009 in Taiwan, Fiji clinched gold for the 3rd time in front of a crowd of 39,000.  The Fijian win preserves Fiji as the only nation to ever capture gold at the games. Represented were South Africa (the reigning IRB Sevens World Series Champions), Portugal (the reigning European Sevens Champions), Argentina (the reigning USA Sevens Champions), Fiji (the reigning World Games gold medalists), and Chinese Taipei (the host nation).  The USA was the biggest disappointment of Day 1 going 0–3 having been expected to compete for a medal.  The biggest surprise of the event was Portugal finding their way into the gold-medal match and coming away with the Silver Medal.

Teams
8 Teams took part in this tournament:

 Chinese Taipei

Pools

Pool A
{| class="wikitable" style="text-align: center;"
|-
! style="width:200px;"|Team
!width="40"|Pld
!width="40"|W
!width="40"|D
!width="40"|L
!width="40"|PF
!width="40"|PA
!width="40"|+/-
|- 
|align=left| 
|3||3||0||0||62||12||50
|-
|align=left| 
|3||2||0||1||46||19||27
|-
|align=left|  Chinese Taipei
|3||1||0||2||27||65||−38
|-
|align=left| 
|3||0||0||3||31||70||−39
|}

Pool B
{| class="wikitable" style="text-align: center;"
|-
! style="width:200px;"|Team
!width="40"|Pld
!width="40"|W
!width="40"|D
!width="40"|L
!width="40"|PF
!width="40"|PA
!width="40"|+/-
|- 
|align=left| 
|3||3||0||0||63||12||51
|-
|align=left| 
|3||2||0||1||52||37||15
|-
|align=left| 
|3||1||0||2||35||39||−4
|-
|align=left| 
|3||0||0||3||15||77||−62
|}

Fixtures

Day 1

Pool A
South Africa 29–0 Chinese Taipei
Portugal 22–7 USA
South Africa 7–5 Portugal
Chinese Taipei 22–17 USA
South Africa 26–7 USA
Portugal 19–5 Chinese Taipei

Pool B
Fiji 26–10 Hong Kong
Argentina 15–5 Japan
Fiji 19–10 Japan
Argentina 31–0 Hong Kong
Argentina 17–7 Fiji
Japan 20–5 Hong Kong

Day 2

Quarter-finals
Argentina 19–12 USA
Portugal 17–0 Japan
Fiji 28–5 Chinese Taipei
South Africa 39–0 Hong Kong

Semifinals

Losers Bracket
Chinese Taipei 17–12 Hong Kong
USA 29–24 Japan

Medals Bracket
Portugal 19–12 Argentina
Fiji 21–7 South Africa

Finals

7th-place match
Japan 20–5 Hong Kong

5th-place match
USA 21–19 Chinese Taipei

Bronze-medal match
South Africa 17–0 Argentina

Gold-medal match
Fiji 43–10 Portugal

References

2009 World Games
2009
World Games
International rugby union competitions hosted by Taiwan